Muscazone is a toxic chemical compound. It is an amino acid found in European fly agaric mushrooms.

Consumption causes visual damage, mental confusion, and memory loss.

See also
Ibotenic acid
Muscimol

References

Amino acids
Mycotoxins
Oxazolones
Toxic amino acids